Cleonymia fatima is a moth of the family Noctuidae first described by Andreas Bang-Haas in 1907. It is found in Algeria, Tunisia, Libya, Jordan and Israel.

Adults are on wing from February to March. There is one generation per year.

External links

Cuculliinae
Moths described in 1907
Moths of the Middle East